Cyril Bird may refer to:

 Fougasse (cartoonist) (Cyril Kenneth Bird, 1887–1965), British cartoonist
 Cyril Handley Bird (1896–1969), British businessman and politician